Serlo I of Hauteville (also spelled Sarlo or Serlon in French) was a son of Tancred of Hauteville by his first wife, Muriella, probably the youngest, though some sources call him the eldest. Born before 1010, he was the eldest son of Tancred's to remain in Normandy. After a dispute with a neighbour (a man of the court of Robert I, duke of Normandy), whom he killed over an insult, Serlo was exiled for three years. Around 1041, his father died and he inherited the small fief of Hauteville in the Cotentin and the sirery of Pirou through his wife. He was regarded, as were his brothers, as an exceptional warrior.

Around 1056, his son Serlo followed his half-brother Roger to the Mezzogiorno and made his fortunes there.

Notes

Sources
Goffredo Malaterra. The Deeds of Count Roger of Calabria and Sicily and of Duke Robert Guiscard his brother.
Norwich, John Julius. The Normans in the South 1016-1130. Longmans: London, 1967.
Ghisalberti, Albert (ed). Dizionario Biografico degli Italiani: II Albicante – Ammannati. Rome, 1960.

11th-century Normans
Serlo
Year of birth missing
Year of death missing